Seafish Louisville is a compilation of songs by The Gits, released posthumously in 2000 on the Broken Rekids label. It is primarily a collection of live tracks and alternative takes, including the then newly discovered track "Whirlwind." The CD+ section of the CD includes the video for "Seaweed" as well as photographs and lyrics.

Track listing 
 "Whirlwind"  – 3:03
 "Seaweed"  – 2:27
 "Absynthe (Live)"  – 3:21
 "Another Shot of Whiskey (Live)"  – 2:35
 "Insecurities (Live)"  – 1:39
 "Slaughter of Bruce (Live)"  – 3:19
 "Precious Blood"  – 4:16
 "While You're Twisting, I'm Still Breathing"   – 2:36
 "A"– 1:25
 "Social Love (Live)"  – 1:55
 "It Doesn't Matter"  – 3:27
 "Kings & Queens"  – 2:00
 "Wingo Lamo (Live)"  – 2:16
 "Here's To Your Fuck (Live)"  – 2:02
 "Second Skin (Live)"   – 2:58
 "Daily Bread"  – 6:03
 (CD+ content)
Live tracks recorded at RKCNDY, Seattle, Washington, on January 14, 1993.

References 

2000 compilation albums
The Gits albums
Albums produced by Jack Endino